is a passenger railway station located in the city of Chichibu, Saitama, Japan, operated by the private railway operator Chichibu Railway.

Lines

Station layout

The station is staffed and consists of a single island platform serving two bidirectional tracks. Additional bidirectional passing tracks and storage sidings lie to the east of the platform tracks.

A triangular line leading to a now closed cement works formerly existed to the east of the station. This was also used for turning Paleo Express steam locomotives before the installation of a turntable at Mitsumineguchi Station.

Platforms

Adjacent stations

History
Chichibu Station opened on 27 October 1914.

Passenger statistics
In fiscal 2018, the station was used by an average of 1159 passengers daily.

Surrounding area
 Arakawa River
 
 
 Chichibu Shrine
 Chichibu Police Station
 Chichibu Fire Station
 Hitsujiyama Park

References

External links

 Chichibu Station information (Saitama Prefectural Government) 
 Chichibu Station timetable 

Railway stations in Japan opened in 1914
Railway stations in Saitama Prefecture
Chichibu, Saitama